Paula Whetu Jones is a New Zealand film director and writer. She is best known for her 2003 documentary Gang Girls, the 2020 comedy series I Date Rejects, and the 2022 feature film Whina, a biopic on the life of Dame Whina Cooper.

Biography 

Jones is of Te Aitanga-a-Māhaki, Whakatōhea, and Ngāti Porou descent. She was raised in Hastings, and spent her early career making documentaries. Her 2003 documentary on the lives of New Zealand women in gangs won Best Television Documentary at the 2003 Qantas Media Awards, and was nominated for best documentary at the 2003 New Zealand Television Awards.

In 2017, Jones was one of the writers and directors of the anthology film Waru, and in 2019 produced the short films A Matter of Time and Yellow Roses. The following year, Jones directed and wrote the TVNZ comedy I Date Rejects.

Paula Whetu Jones is a co-director of the feature film Whina, a biopic detailing the life of Dame Whina Cooper. Jones was initially approached to become a producer of Whina, but connected so strongly with Cooper's story that she asked to become a greater part of the production, becoming one of the film's cowriters and codirectors.

Jones is working on a television series based on her experiences at the Burwood Spinal Unit in Christchurch.

Personal life

Jones is a mother to three children. In 2010 became paralysed from the waist down due to idiopathic transverse myelitis.

Filmography

Films

Television

References

21st-century New Zealand writers
21st-century screenwriters
Indigenous filmmakers in New Zealand
Living people
Māori-language film directors
New Zealand film directors
New Zealand Māori film producers
New Zealand screenwriters
New Zealand women film directors
New Zealand women screenwriters
People from Hastings, New Zealand
Ngāti Porou people
Te Aitanga-a-Māhaki people
Whakatōhea people
Wheelchair users
Year of birth missing (living people)